Pteroteinon ceucaenira, the pale white-banded red-eye, is a butterfly in the family Hesperiidae. It is found in Sierra Leone, Liberia, Ivory Coast, Ghana, Nigeria, Cameroon, the Republic of the Congo, the Democratic Republic of the Congo, Uganda and north-western Tanzania. The habitat consists of forests.

References

Butterflies described in 1910
Erionotini